Fishbourne is a village and civil parish in the Chichester District of West Sussex, England and is situated two miles west of Chichester.

The Anglican parish of Fishbourne, formerly New Fishbourne, is in the Diocese of Chichester. The population in 1861 was 347. The parish church is dedicated to St Peter and St Mary.

In the 2001 census 1,953 people lived in 840 households, of whom 910 were economically active. There are two public houses and a railway station.

History

Toponymy 

Domesday Book
Fishbourne is listed the Domesday Book of 1086 in the Hundred of Stockbridge as having 18 households, two mills, meadows and plough lands, with an annual value of 7 pounds.

Governance
Fishbourne civil parish was created in 1987 from parts of Appledram, Bosham, Chichester and Funtington parishes.  The parish falls under the Chichester District Council ward of Harbour Villages, the West Sussex County Council division of Chichester West, and the UK Parliament constituency of Chichester, whose MP since 2017 is Gillian Keegan of the Conservative Party.

Roman Palace
Fishbourne is the location of Fishbourne Roman Palace, a major archaeological site. On the site have been found remains dating to around the time of the Roman conquest of Britain in AD 43.  One theory is that this was the site of one of the landings by the Romans designed to secure the 'friendly' tribe of the Atrebates, whose King Verica had fled his enemies for Roman protection.  Subsequently, the wooden buildings were replaced by one of the greatest Roman palaces in the Roman world.  The palace was damaged by fire at the end of the third century and never rebuilt.

Fishbourne Manor 
Located at the North end of Appledram Lane South, between the parishes of Appledram and Fishbourne, origins of The Manor can be dated back to the reign of Henry VIII.

Fishbourne was annexed to the honor of Petworth in April 1540 and for the first time referred to as a Manor. It is said to have been held of the Crown in chief by 'Sir Thomas White and others' in 1558, but in 1560 the Manor of New Fishbourne was granted to John Fenner, who died on Christmas Day 1566. From 1570, The Manor was owned by Francis Bowyer, alderman of London, and his wife Elizabeth. Their son Sir William Bowyer settled the manor on himself and his wife Mary in 1605, and four years later passed it on his son Henry on his marriage with Anne, daughter of Nicholas Salter. In 1633, The Manor was sold to William Cawley. During The Restoration, Cawley's estates were forfeited and Fishbourne was among the manors given to James, Duke of York. Other recorded owners of The Manor House included Sir John Biggs, Sir Thomas Miller, Dame Susannah Miller, The Rev. Sir Thomas Combe Miller, 6th bart., Edward Stanford and Major-General Byron.

The Manor House is dated 1687 on a North wing added to the building by Sir Thomas Miller.

Notable people 
British writer, Kate Mosse, was raised in Fishbourne.

References

External links

Villages in West Sussex
Fishbourne